Jayant Sinha (born 21 April 1963) is an Indian politician who is the Member of Indian Parliament and formerly the Minister of State for Finance and the Minister of State for Civil Aviation in the Government of India. Sinha is currently the Chairperson for Standing Committee on Finance and a member of the Public Accounts Committee for 2019–20. He has also been an investment fund manager and management consultant.

In May 2014, he was elected to the Lok Sabha, representing the Bharatiya Janata Party from Hazaribagh, Jharkhand. In the 2019 general elections, Sinha was re-elected as Member of Parliament from the same constituency with a record majority.

Sinha's prior business experience includes twelve years with McKinsey & Company as a partner in the Boston and Delhi offices. At McKinsey, Sinha co-led the global Software and IT Services practice. He was most recently a partner at Omidyar Network. Sinha led ON's overall investment strategy and operations in India. He also spent several years as a Managing Director at Courage Capital, a global special situations hedge fund.

Personal life
He was born in a religious Chitraguptvanshi Kayastha family in Giridih, Jharkhand, where his father, Yashwant Sinha, was stationed as an IAS officer. In his youth, Jayant lived in Bihar, Delhi and Germany.  He was educated at St. Michael's High School, Patna and St. Columba's School, Delhi. In 1980, Jayant passed the JEE while in the 11th grade on his first attempt, and was admitted to Indian Institute of Technology Delhi. He was awarded the IIT Delhi's Distinguished Alumni Award in October 2015. While at IIT, Sinha met his future wife Punita, and they were married in 1986. They have two sons.

After graduating from IIT Delhi in 1985, Sinha enrolled at the University of Pennsylvania, and completed a Master of Science in Energy Management & Policy in 1986. Later, Sinha also attended Harvard Business School, and obtained an MBA with Distinction in 1992.

Political career

Jayant Sinha has participated in Indian politics and policy-making since the 1990s. When his father became Finance Minister under Atal Bihari Vajpayee (1998-2002), Sinha provided policy inputs on several new initiatives such as the mortgage interest tax deduction and the Saral form to file income tax returns with ease and improve tax compliance.

Sinha has been active in Hazaribagh, assisting his father's election campaigns since 1998.  He has also worked on a variety of projects in Hazaribagh and Ramgarh districts such as fostering self-help groups, distributing solar lanterns, improving drinking water quality, and getting village roads built.

During the 2014 election campaign, Sinha worked with Prime Minister Narendra Modi to help frame national economic policy, including organizing and hosting an international business leaders' forum with Mr. Modi in February 2014. Sinha has been an active contributor to the BJP's efforts to develop new campaign management technologies and systems.

In 2014, Sinha contested Lok Sabha elections from the Hazaribagh seat in his home state of Jharkhand. He won the elections with a huge margin of 1,59,128 votes, getting a total of 4,06,931 in his favour. After joining parliament, Sinha was a member of four parliamentary committees - Public Accounts Committee, Standing Committee on Finance and Subordinate Committee on Legislation and of the Consultative Committee for the Ministry of Communications and Information Technology.

In 2019, Sinha contested for the second time from Hazaribagh constituency and registered 728,798 votes out of the 1,070,929 votes cast.

Ministerial career

Ministry of Finance

Sinha was sworn-in as Minister of State in the Union Council of Ministers on 9 November 2014. Subsequently, he assumed charge at the Ministry of Finance in the Indian Government, working with Finance Minister Arun Jaitley. There, he helped in driving landmark initiatives such as PM Mudra Yojana, Social Security Platform, devising the Indradhanush package for public sector banks, launching the India Aspiration Fund to promote entrepreneurship, and strengthening India's capital markets. He piloted key legislations, namely the Insurance Bill, Bankruptcy Bill, Negotiable Instruments  Act and Regional Rural Banks Bill in the Parliament. He also helped in preparing the Union Budgets of 2015-16 and 2016–17, which were widely hailed as two of the most significant and visionary budgets in recent years. Sinha is often credited with devising and driving innovative financing institutions, such as the National Infrastructure and Investment Fund, Long Term Irrigation Fund, India Aspiration Fund and Higher Education Financing Agency.

Ministry of Civil Aviation

After the Ministry of Finance, Sinha moved to the Ministry of Civil Aviation on 6 July 2016. His appointment came just after the government unveiled the first-ever National Civil Aviation Policy (NCAP). His work in the Ministry of Civil Aviation has been widely appreciated and has led to the complete transformation of India's aviation ecosystem. India is now the world's third largest domestic aviation market and has seen 50 months of unprecedented double digit passenger growth. It is the fastest-growing large aviation market in the world.

The Regional Connectivity Scheme was formulated under Sinha's guidance and is the flagship scheme of the NCAP. On 27 April 2017, PM Narendra Modi launched the Regional Connectivity Scheme UDAN (Ude Desh ka Aam Nagrik) scheme from the Jubbarhatti airport in Shimla. At the launch of the scheme, Mr Sinha said the citizens would reap the benefit of development of remote areas, enhance trade and commerce and more tourism expansion. UDAN has already added more than 35 airports to the existing 70 operational airports thus dramatically expanding the Indian aviation network and bringing air travel to Tier 2 and 3 cities such as Bikaner, Adhampur, and Kanpur. UDAN operates at three levels to ensure route profitability: reducing operating costs as much as possible, providing a market discovered subsidy for half the seats and guaranteeing a three-year exclusivity on routes. The second bidding round (UDAN 2) prioritized helicopters leading to bids for more than 50 heliports in hilly areas and islands. The focus in UDAN 3 is on tourism destinations such as Kajuraho and on international routes for cities such as Guwahati.

The air traveller experience has been transformed during Sinha's tenure. He worked with security and customs agencies to reduce the use of unnecessary forms, eliminate baggage stamping, and enable e-boarding. Sinha developed the innovative AirSewa grievance redressal and flight information mobile app. With this app, air passengers can register their complaints about any member of the aviation ecosystem including airlines, airports, security, immigration, or customs. Passengers get an acknowledgement of their complaint and the government monitors satisfactory closure of their complaint.  He has been a strong propagator of using technology to connect to the people directly and AirSewa concept originated from his handling of passenger grievances on various social media channels. Under his leadership, a Passenger Charter has been released to strengthen and formalize passenger rights. A first of its kind safety-oriented National No-Fly list has been formulated to prevent unruly behaviour during flights bringing down such incidents sharply.

Sinha led the preparation of the NABH (Next Gen Airports for BHarat) Nirmaan program which was announced in Budget FY 18-19 and aims to strengthen airport infrastructure for a billion passenger trips. This would represent a five-fold capacity increase from the approximately 200 million trips in FY 17-18. He has been instrumental in introducing a revised public-private-partnership model for airport privatization and six airports have been offered for PPP. As part of the NABH Nirmaan program, over $15 billion of airport investments are currently underway in India. To ensure that Indian airports reflect local art and culture, Sinha worked with the Airports Authority of India to constitute a Design Council comprising India's top architects and artists. The Design Council provides a Design Brief incorporating a strong ‘sense of place’ for the design of airport terminals. This has resulted in much-praised terminal designs in Lucknow, Agartala, Leh, Chennai, Patna, and so on.

Sinha also played a crucial role in conceptualising the framework for the strategic privatization of Air India including the creation of an innovative SPV structure to manage Air India's non-core assets. Sinha has also worked with the Air India Board to formulate the MaharajahDirect strategy for Air India to become a competitive global airline. 
 
Sinha led the formulation of the DigiYatra technology standards which brings together the aviation sector to implement a digital ecosystem for seamless, all-digital travel across all Indian airports and airlines. DigiYatra is being implement in Bengaluru airport in January 2019 and several AAI airports in March 2019. This is the first national digital traveller system in the world and is being studied for implementation in other countries as well. Sinha chairs the Drone Task Force and led the efforts to introduce India's world-leading drone regulations, which are based on his DigitalSky framework. The next set of drone regulations are intended to expand drone usage to cross the Beyond Visual Line of Sight (BVLOS), payload, and automation thresholds. The DigitalSky framework went live on 1 December 2018. The goal of the Drone Task Force is to ensure that India becomes a world leader in the design, manufacture, and safe usage of drones.

In October 2016 Jayant Sinha signed an MoU between the Ministry of Civil Aviation and the Ministry of Skill Development and Entrepreneurship for training of people in the various trades associated with the civil aviation sector to meet the potential of 60 lakh jobs in the next ten years. Later on 28 February 2017, MoS for Civil Aviation Jayant Sinha inaugurated India's first ever integrated heliport in Rohini, New Delhi along with the then Union Minister for Civil Aviation Ashok Gajapathi Raju.

On September 2018 Jayant Sinha announced the digital sky policy that will enable the government of India to digitise the entire sky and control the drone ecosystem. This policy under the tenure of Jayant Sinha was in two phases. In the first phase, the platform will register pilots, devices and services providers. The second phase will include automation, bi-modal control and setting up of dedicated air corridors. Jayant Sinha Minister of State for Civil Aviation added that once we digitise the sky, we will be able to give people rights to use certain slices of it for some period of time. Industry experts believed that the policy has broken new ground with digital sky platform and NPNT (no permission, no take-off).

Development of Hazaribagh
On 23 February 2017 MP from Hazaribagh Jayant Sinha laid the foundation stone for three medical colleges in Dumka, Palamau and Hazaribagh along with the Chief Minister of Jharkhand Mr. Raghubar Das.

Professional career
After his graduation from Harvard Business School, Sinha joined McKinsey & Company in Boston, and was elected Partner in 1999. At McKinsey, Sinha co‐led the Global Software & IT Services Practice. Sinha returned to India in 2002 with McKinsey, before leaving to join Courage Capital, a global special- situations hedge fund, to lead their India tech and investing efforts.

After Courage Capital, Sinha joined Omidyar Network, founded by Pam and Pierre Omidyar. Till December 2013, he was a partner at ON and the Managing Director of Omidyar Network India Advisors. He also served on Omidyar Network's five - member global executive committee. During his time there, Omidyar's India portfolio grew to over 35 companies and organizations totaling investments worth over $100 million. He also helped in funding the Indian Impact Investing Council.

Sinha has served on the boards of several companies and organizations, including Daily Hunt, d.light, iMerit and Janaagraha.  He was invited to serve on the International Advisory Board of the International Finance Corporation, Washington DC.

In the media
Sinha has been quoted widely in the global media for his views on business and economic policy, including in The Economist, the Wall Street Journal, Business Week, the New York Times, CNN, Bloomberg, and CNBC. His essays and op-eds have been published in several major publications, including the Harvard Business Review and the Financial Times.

Articles written by Jayant Sinha, such as the Paradox of Fast Growth Tigers in the McKinsey Quarterly 'Strategies That Fit Emerging Markets'  in the Harvard Business Review and 'It is time for India to rein in its robber barons'  in the Financial Times have widely been quoted in scholarly works and are used as reference material in business schools.

In November 2017 an investigation conducted by the International Consortium of Investigative Journalism cited his name in the list of politicians named in "Paradise Papers" allegations.

Social media 

In 2018, Jayant Sinha triggered controversy by allegedly garlanding 8 lynching convicts who murdered a Muslim. His father, Yashwant Sinha, criticised his actions publicly in multiple platforms. Sinha got involved in this matter in April 2018 after the Fast-Track Court sentenced all 11 adult accused to life imprisonment for murder on 21 March 2018. He and local BJP leaders had provided the accused the legal assistance and eight of them were released on bail on 4 July 2018 after spending a year in jail. The Hon'ble Ranchi High Court, which is the first court of appeal, has suspended the sentence of the eight accused and released them on bail while admitting their case. High Court order, inter alia, reads: "...it is only apparent that the appellants were the members of the mob, and in view of lack of evidence of specific assault against them, we are inclined to release the appellants on bail".

Sinha restated his position immediately through a series of tweets, explaining that (a) he condemned all violence and vigilantism; (b) the rule of law is supreme; (c) the guilty should be punished, but the innocent should get justice as well; and (d) he did not, in any way, condone vigilantism, and sincerely regretted if that's the impression that he gave. Through his media interviews, Sinha has repeatedly stated that his intervention is the matter was not to condone vigilantism but to ensure justice for all.

References

External links 
 Jayant Sinha - Profile

India MPs 2014–2019
Indian management consultants
IIT Delhi alumni
Harvard Business School alumni
University of Pennsylvania alumni
1963 births
Living people
People from Bihar
People from Hazaribagh district
Lok Sabha members from Jharkhand
McKinsey & Company people
Bharatiya Janata Party politicians from Jharkhand
Narendra Modi ministry
India MPs 2019–present
People named in the Paradise Papers